Eat Pray Love is a 2010 American biographical romantic drama film starring Julia Roberts as Elizabeth Gilbert, based on Gilbert's 2006 memoir of the same name. Ryan Murphy co-wrote and directed the film, which was released in the United States on August 13, 2010. It received mixed reviews from critics, but was a financial success, grossing $204.6 million worldwide against a $60 million budget.

Plot
Elizabeth 'Liz' Gilbert had everything a modern woman is supposed to dream of having – a husband, a house, a successful career – yet like so many others, she found herself lost, confused, and searching for what she really wanted in life.

Inexplicably unhappy and restless after eight years, Liz doesn't want to be married anymore. Stephen doesn't understand why and doesn't accept the divorce easily. In the meantime she has a brief affair with David, a young actor. Newly divorced and at a crossroads, Liz steps out of her comfort zone, risking everything to change her life, embarking on a three point trip: Italy, India and Bali, a journey around the world that becomes a quest for self-discovery.

In her travels, she discovers the true pleasure of nourishment by eating in Italy, enjoying pastas and gelato for four months. A new Swedish friend introduces her to a private Italian tutor, and they celebrate Thanksgiving together right before she departs for her next stop. Liz heads to an ashram where she experiences the power of prayer in India. In addition to mass prayer sessions, honoring their guru, she is assigned the chore of scrubbing floors. 'Texas Richard' keeps her on her toes as well as supporting her. When he's ready to move on, she's reassigned to greeting and orienting new arrivals.

Feeling more centered, Liz moves on to Bali, Indonesia. A year after first meeting him, she reintroduces herself to Ketut there. He gives her various tasks. While Liz is cycling she is run off the road by Felipe, a Brazilian. She is sent to Wayan in the village to help cure a bad gash in her leg. There she meets Brazilian Armenia. She convinces her to come back to the village that night to the Beach Shack for dancing.

There, Felipe approaches Liz, apologizing for almost killing her with his jeep. Armenia then tries to set her up with young Ian, but she doesn't want another idle fling. Felipe offers to give her a lift. Hours later he returns with a hangover cure and his number. They hook up, and two weeks later Liz makes an appeal to her friends to donate to Wayan's future house, coming up with over $18,000. When Felipe proposes they spend a few days together in a remote spot, Liz panics, breaking up with him.

Deciding her time there is over, Liz gets prepared to leave and stops to say farewell to Ketut. He encourages her to embrace and, not run from love. She acknowledges his advice and runs to the dock after Felipe where she confesses her feelings to him. Finally and unexpectedly, the inner peace and balance of true love comes to her.

Cast

 Julia Roberts as Elizabeth "Liz" Gilbert
 Javier Bardem as Felipe, a Brazilian businessman Liz falls in love with on her journey
 James Franco as David, the man Liz has an intense relationship with while she is finalizing her divorce
 Richard Jenkins as Richard, a Texan Liz befriends at an Indian ashram
 Viola Davis as Delia Shiraz, Liz's best friend
 Billy Crudup as Steven, Liz's ex-husband
 Sophie Thompson as Corella, a woman at the Indian ashram
 Mike O'Malley as Andy Shiraz, Delia's husband
 Christine Hakim as Wayan, Liz's best friend in Indonesia
 Arlene Tur as Armenia 
 Hadi Subiyanto as Ketut Liyer, Liz's advisor in Indonesia
 Gita Reddy as The Guru 
 Tuva Novotny as Sofi, Liz's Swedish best friend in Rome
 Luca Argentero as Giovanni, Liz's Italian tutor and Sofi's love interest
 Rushita Singh as Tulsi, Liz's friend at the ashram
 Laksmi De-Neefe Suardana and Dewi De-Neefe Suardana as the owners of Indus restaurant.

Production
Eat Pray Love began principal photography in August 2009. Filming locations include New York City (United States), Rome and Naples (Italy), Delhi and Pataudi (India), Ubud and Padang-Padang Beach at Bali (Indonesia).

Hindu leaders voiced concern over the production of the film and advocated the use of spiritual consultants to ensure that the film conveyed an accurate reflection of life in an ashram. Both Salon.com and The New York Post have suggested that Gurumayi Chidvilasananda was the guru featured in the film and in the book by Elizabeth Gilbert on which the film was based, though Gilbert herself did not identify the ashram or the guru by name.

The two Balinese lead characters (Ketut Liyer and Wayan) are played by Indonesian actors Hadi Subiyanto and Christine Hakim, respectively.

Soundtrack
 "Flight Attendant" by Josh Rouse
 "Last Tango In Paris (Suite, Part 2)" by Gato Barbieri
 "Thank You" by Sly & the Family Stone
 "Der Hölle Rache kocht in meinem Herzen" (from Mozart's The Magic Flute) by Wiener Philharmoniker
 "Heart of Gold" by Neil Young
 "Kaliyugavaradana" by U. Srinivas
 "The Long Road" by Eddie Vedder and Nusrat Fateh Ali Khan
 "Harvest Moon" by Neil Young
 "Samba da Bênção" by Bebel Gilberto
 "Wave" by João Gilberto
 "Got to Give It Up, Part 1" by Marvin Gaye
 "'S Wonderful" by João Gilberto
 "Better Days" by Eddie Vedder
 "Attraversiamo" by Dario Marianelli
 "Dreams" by Fleetwood Mac
 "Boyz" by M.I.A.

Reception

Box office
The film debuted at #2 behind The Expendables with $23,104,523. It had the highest debut at the box office with Roberts in a lead role since America's Sweethearts in 2001. During its initial ten-day run, revenue grew to a total of $47.2 million. The competing film The Expendables features Eric Roberts, Julia Roberts's brother, and the box office pitted Roberts versus Roberts. Hollywood.com commented that "sibling rivalry is rarely as publicly manifested" as this. The film, produced on a $60 million budget, grossed $80,574,382 in the United States and Canada and has a worldwide total of $204,594,016.

Critical response 
On Rotten Tomatoes, the film has a 36% approval rating based on 210 reviews with an average rating of 5.20/10. The site's critical consensus reads "The scenery is nice to look at, and Julia Roberts is as luminous as ever, but without the spiritual and emotional weight of the book that inspired it, Eat Pray Love is too shallow to resonate." On Metacritic, it has a score of 50 based on reviews from 39 critics, indicating "mixed or average reviews". Audiences surveyed by CinemaScore gave the film a grade B on scale of A to F.

Peter Bradshaw of The Guardian gave the film 1 out of 5 stars, beginning his review "Sit, watch, groan. Yawn, fidget, stretch. Eat Snickers, pray for end of dire film about Julia Roberts's emotional growth, love the fact it can't last for ever. Wince, daydream, frown. Resent script, resent acting, resent dinky tripartite structure. Grit teeth, clench fists, focus on plot. Troubled traveller Julia finds fulfilment through exotic foreign cuisine, exotic foreign religion, sex with exotic foreign Javier Bardem. Film patronises Italians, Indians, Indonesians. Julia finds spirituality, rejects rat race, gives Balinese therapist 16 grand to buy house. Balinese therapist is grateful, thankful, humble. Sigh, blink, sniff. Check watch, groan, slump."

Wesley Morris of The Boston Globe gave the film 3 out of 4 stars while writing "Is it a romantic comedy? Is it a chick flick? This is silly, since, in truth, it's neither. It's simply a Julia Roberts movie, often a lovely one." San Francisco Chronicle film critic Mick LaSalle overall positively reviewed the film and praised Murphy's "sensitive and tasteful direction" as it "finds way to illuminate and amplify Gilbert's thoughts and emotions, which are central to the story".

Negative reviews appeared in The Chicago Reader, in which Andrea Gronvall commented that the film is "ass-numbingly wrong",<ref>{{cite web |url=http://www.chicagoreader.com/chicago/MovieTimes?oid=2157933 |last=Gronvall |first=Andrea |title=Eat Pray Love Showtimes & Reviews |publisher=Creative Loafing Media |work=Chicago Reader |date=August 12, 2010 |access-date=September 14, 2020 }}</ref> and Rolling Stone, in which Peter Travers referred to watching it as "being trapped with a person of privilege who won't stop with the whine whine whine." Humor website Something Awful ran a scathing review. Martin R. "Vargo" Schneider highlighted several aspects of the film that he considered completely unrealistic. Political columnist Maureen Dowd termed the film "navel-gazing drivel" in October 2010.

The BBC's Mark Kermode listed the film as 4th on his list of Worst Films of the Year, saying: "Eat Pray Love... vomit. A film with the message that learning to love yourself is the greatest love of all, although I think the people who made that film loved themselves rather too much."

In The Huffington Post, critic Jenna Busch wrote:

In the Italian newspaper La Repubblica, journalist Curzio Maltese wrote:

The film received generally negative reviews in the Italian press.

Merchandising
Marketers for the film created over 400 merchandising tie-ins. Products included Eat Pray Love-themed jewelry, perfume, tea, gelato machines, an oversized Indonesian bench, prayer beads, and a bamboo window shade. World Market department store opened an entire section in all of their locations devoted to merchandise tied to the movie.

The Home Shopping Network ran 72 straight hours of programming featuring Eat Pray Love products around the time of the film's release. The decision to market such a wide range of products, hardly any of which were actually featured in the film, brought criticism from The Philadelphia Inquirer, The Washington Post and The Huffington Post''.

See also
 Julia Roberts filmography

References

External links

 
 
 
 

2010 films
2010s English-language films
2010 romantic drama films
American romantic drama films
Columbia Pictures films
Drama films based on actual events
Films based on memoirs
Films directed by Ryan Murphy (writer)
Films scored by Dario Marianelli
Films set in India
Films set in Indonesia
Films set in Naples
Films set in New York City
Films set in Rome
Films shot in India
Films shot in Indonesia
Films shot in Naples
Films shot in New York City
Films shot in Rome
2010s Italian-language films
Plan B Entertainment films
2010s Portuguese-language films
Romance films based on actual events
Films with screenplays by Ryan Murphy (writer)
Films about travel
2010 multilingual films
American multilingual films
2010s American films